Axel Gabriel Erik Mørch better known as Gabriel Axel (18 April 1918 – 9 February 2014) was a Danish film director, actor, writer and producer, best known for Babette's Feast (1987), which he wrote and directed.

Biography 
Born in Aarhus, Denmark, on 18 April 1918, Axel spent most of his childhood in Paris in a wealthy Danish manufacturer's family.

In 1935, at age 17 following the family's economic collapse, he moved to Denmark and trained as a cabinet maker. In 1942, Axel was admitted to the acting school at the Royal Danish Theatre in Copenhagen. After graduating in 1945, he returned to France where he spent five years on stage in Paris, including at the Théâtre de l'Athénée under theatre director Louis Jouvet. During the winter of 1948–1949 he produced Ludvig Holberg's Diderich Menschenskraek (Diderich the Terrible) at Théâtre de Paris.

Axel returned to Denmark in 1950, and broke through as a stage director in the early 1950s. His productions included La tête des autres (Other People's Heads) by Marcel Aymé, Le Cid by Pierre Corneille, and Pour Lucrèce by Jean Giraudoux. Axel started directing for television in 1951, and, from 1951 to 1968, did some 48 television dramas.

From 1955, Axel was a director at Nordisk Film. His debut feature, the social-realist drama Nothing But Trouble (1955), was highly praised, and the breakthrough came with the TV film A Woman Not Wanted in 1957.

He went on to direct a string of lighter comedies and farces before making the epic Nordic saga The Red Mantle in 1967, which was selected for Cannes Film Festival competition and won a Technical Prize (Mention spéciale du grand prix technique) at the 1967 Cannes Film Festival. His other films include the popular comedy The Goldcabbage Family (1975) and its sequel, and a series of sexually oriented features including the campaigning Det kære legetøj (1968) which advocated the legalisation of pornography in Denmark.

With some 16 feature films to his credits Axel returned to France in 1977, where he directed several large projects for French television, culminating in 1985 with a historical five-episode series,  (Heaven's Pillars).

In 1987, Axel returned to Denmark to direct what had been his dream project for over 15 years, and is considered his masterpiece, an adaptation of Karen Blixen's Babette's Feast.  After screening at the Cannes Film Festival, the film won the Academy Award for Best Foreign Language Film at the 60th Academy Awards among others.

His next films, the youth drama Christian (1989), the historical drama Prince of Jutland (1994), after the legend of Prince Amleth, and starring Helen Mirren, Gabriel Byrne, and Christian Bale, and Leïla (2001), a love story set in Morocco, failed to achieve the same international resonance.

Alongside his directing career, Axel acted in a dozen Danish films, mostly in colourful supporting roles in popular comedies in the 1950s and 60s. He played the lead as the elegant charlatan Marcel de Sade in The Reluctant Sadist (1967).

Axel in 1995, was made a Knight of the French National Order of Merit, in 2000 Commander of the Ordre des Arts et des Lettres, and in 2003 was made Officer of the Legion of Honour. In 2003, Axel received a Lifetime Achievement Award at the Copenhagen International Film Festival. In 2012 he received the Rungstedlund Award.

Axel died in his sleep on 9 February 2014 at the age of 95.

Selected filmography

References

External links 
 
 

1918 births
2014 deaths
20th-century Danish male actors
Commandeurs of the Ordre des Arts et des Lettres
Danish film directors
Danish male screenwriters
Directors of Best Foreign Language Film Academy Award winners
Filmmakers who won the Best Foreign Language Film BAFTA Award
People from Aarhus
Recipients of the Legion of Honour